Vincent Costello (April 8, 1932 – June 22, 2019) was an American football linebacker who played 12 seasons in the National Football League for the Cleveland Browns (1956–66) and New York Giants (1967–68).  He later coached with Paul Brown as linebackers coach for the Cincinnati Bengals (1969–1973); Miami Dolphins (1974) and the Kansas City Chiefs (until his retirement).

Biography 
Costello graduated from Magnolia High School in 1949.

Costello lived in Kansas City, Missouri, where he owned a company that makes and designs various sports collectibles, including a line exclusively designed for the Pro Football Hall of Fame. His store was called Vince Costello's Collectibles.

In 2012, the Plain Dealer named Costello the 56th best player in Browns history.

He died in Overland Park, Kansas on June 23, 2019

References

External links
Canton Repository Article 2002

1932 births
2019 deaths
People from Carroll County, Ohio
Businesspeople from Kansas City, Missouri
Players of American football from Ohio
American football linebackers
Cleveland Browns players
New York Giants players
Ohio Bobcats football players
20th-century American businesspeople